Freddy (also Freddi and Freddie) is a diminutive used by both men and women whose names contain the Germanic element -fred, notable examples of such being Frederick, Frederica, and Alfred. In rare cases, it may be used a diminutive of any name containing -fred, regardless of origin, as with Freddy Adu and Freddie Benson, both Ghanaians named Fredua.

People

In sports
 Freddy (Angolan footballer) (born 1979), Angolan footballer
 Freddy Adu (born 1989), American soccer player
 Freddie Banks (born 1965), American basketball player
 Freddie Barnes (born 1986), American football wide receiver
 Freddie Beck (1904–1987), English golfer
 Freddie Bishop III (born 1990), American football player
 Freddie Bradley (born 1970), American football running back
 Freddie Braun (born 1988), American soccer player
 Freddie Brorsson (born 1997), Swedish footballer
 Fred Brown (basketball) (born 1948), American former National Basketball Association player known as "Downtown Freddie Brown"
 Freddie Brown (cricketer) (1910–1991), former cricketer and cricket commentator
 Freddie Brown (footballer) (1878–1939), footballer for Stoke and West Bromwich Albion
 Freddie Bunce (1938–1991), English footballer
 Freddie Burch (1886–?), English footballer
 Freddie Calthorpe (1892–1935), English cricketer
 Freddie Clarke (born 1992), English rugby union player
 Freddie Clayton (1873–1946), English first-class cricketer
 Freddie Coleman (born 1991), Scottish cricketer
 Freddie Crum (1912–1987), American basketball player
 Freddie Douglas (born 1954), National Football League wide receiver
 Freddie Dunkelman (1920–2010), British ice hockey player
 Freddie Elizalde (born 1940), Filipino former swimmer
 Freddie Eriksson (born 1981), Swedish motorcycle speedway rider
 Freddie Fenton (1879–?), English footballer
 Freddy Fernández (actor) (1934–1995), Mexican actor
 Freddy Fernández (footballer) (born 1974), Costa Rican footballer
 Brad Fittler (born 1972), Australian rugby league player nicknamed "Freddy"
 Andrew Flintoff (born 1977), English cricketer nicknamed "Freddie"
 Freddie Fox (footballer) (1898–1968), English football goalkeeper
 Freddie Fox (jockey) (1888–1945), British horse racing jockey
 Freddie Freeman (born 1989), American-Canadian baseball player
 Freddie Frith (1909–1988), British Grand Prix motorcycle road racing world champion
 Freddy Stephen Fuller, 1960s Canadian amateur boxing champion
 Freddy García (born 1976), Venezuelan who pitched for several Major League Baseball teams
 Freddie Garcia (born 1958), Mexican-American soccer player
 Freddy García (infielder) (born 1972), baseball infielder
 Freddy García (football manager) (born 1959), Peruvian football manager
 Freddy García (footballer) (born 1977), Guatemalan footballer
 Alfredo Razon Gonzalez (born 1978), Filipino football player nicknamed "Freddy"
 Freddy González (born 1977), Venezuelan long-distance runner
 Fredy González (born 1975), Colombian road racing cyclist
 Freddie Goss, American basketball coach
 Freddie Hubalde (born 1953), Filipino retired basketball player
 Freddie Kitchens (born 1974), American football coach
 Freddy Leach (1897–1981), American Major League Baseball player
 Freddie Martino (born 1991), American football player
 Freddie Miller (boxer) (1911–1962), American boxer
 Freddie Miller (rugby league) (died 1960), British rugby league footballer of the 1940s and 1950s
 Freddy Moncada (born 1973), Colombian retired road cyclist
 Freddy Montaña (born 1982), Colombian road cyclist
 Freddie Joe Nunn (born 1962), American former National Football League player
 Freddie Pethard (born 1950), Scottish retired footballer
 Freddie Roach (boxing) (born 1960), American boxing trainer and former professional boxer
 Freddy Rodríguez (baseball) (1924–2009), former Major League Baseball pitcher
 Freddy Rodriguez (cyclist) (born 1973), American professional road racing cyclist
 Freddy Sanchez (born 1977), American retired Major League Baseball player
 Freddie Solomon (1953–2012), American National Football League player
 Freddie Solomon (American football, born 1972), American retired National Football League player
 Freddie Spencer (born 1961), American former world champion motorcycle racer
 Freddie Steele (1912–1984), American world middleweight boxing champion and actor
 Freddie Steele (footballer) (1916–1976), English footballer and manager
 Freddie Summers (born 1947), American National Football League player
 Freddie Swain (born 1998), American football player
 Freddy Vargas (born 1982), Venezuelan road cyclist
 Freddie Williams (speedway rider) (1926–2013), motorcycle speedway world champion
 Freddie Williams (athlete) (born 1962), Canadian track and field runner

Artists and entertainers
 Freddie Aguilar (born 1953), Filipino singer-songwriter and musician
 Freddie Bell (1931–2008), American musician, founder of the vocal group Freddie Bell and the Bellboys
 Freddy Beras-Goico (1940–2010), Dominican comedian, TV presenter, writer and media personality
 Freddie Brown (musician) (1940–2002), American musician
 Freddy Cannon (born 1936), American rock and roll singer
 Freddy Cole (born 1931), American jazz singer and pianist, brother of Nat King Cole
 Freddie Colloca (born 1975), Argentine-American Christian musician, pianist, and worship leader
 Freddie Crump (died 1980), drummer from the United States
 Freddie Fisher (musician) (1904–1967), American musician
 Freddie Burke Frederick (1921–1986), American child actor
 Freddie Fox (actor) (born 1989), English actor
 Freddie Garrity (1936–2006), British singer and actor, frontman of the pop band Freddie and the Dreamers
 Freddie Gibbs (born 1982), American rapper and songwriter
 Freddie Green (1911–1987), American swing jazz guitarist
 Freddie Hart (1926–2018), stage name of Frederick Segrest, American country musician and songwriter
 Freddie Hubbard (1938–2008), American jazz trumpeter
 Freddie King (1934–1976), American blues guitarist and singer
 Freddie A. Lerche (born 1937), Danish painter
 Freddy Martin (1906–1983), American bandleader and tenor saxophonist
 Freddie Mercury (1946–1991), Zanzibarian-born musician, lead singer of the British rock band Queen
 Freddie Miller (broadcaster) (1929–1992), broadcaster and television personality in Atlanta, Georgia, United States
 Freddie Prinze (1954–1977), American actor and stand-up comedian
 Freddie Prinze Jr. (born 1976), American actor, son of the above
 Freddy Quinn (born 1931) or simply "Freddy", Austrian singer and actor
 Freddie Roach (organist) (1931–1980), American soul jazz musician
 Freddy Rodriguez (actor) (born 1975), American actor
 Freddy Rodríguez (artist) (born 1945), Dominican Republic artist in the United States
 Freddie Smith (born 1988), American actor
 Freddie Starr (1943–2019), English comedian, impressionist, singer and actor born Frederick Leslie Fowell
 Freddie Stone (born 1947), American co-founder, guitarist, and vocalist of the band Sly and the Family Stone
 Freddie Washington (bassist), jazz-influenced bass guitarist
 Freddie Washington (pianist), American jazz pianist
 Freddy Wexler (born 1986), American producer, songwriter and entrepreneur
 Freddie Williams II (born 1977), comics artist
 Freddie Young (1902–1998), British cinematographer
 Freddie (singer) (born 1990), alias of Gábor Alfréd Fehérvári, Hungarian singer
 Freddie Anderson (1922–2001), Irish writer, playwright, author, poet and socialist
 Freddie Brocksieper (1912–1990), German jazz-musician, drummer, and bandleader
 Freddie Bruno (born 1978), American Christian hip hop musician
 Daddy Freddy (born 1965), Jamaican ragga vocalist

Politicians and businesspeople
 Freddy de Ruiter (born 1969), Norwegian politician
 Freddy Heineken (1923–2002), Dutch businessman, chairman of the board and CEO of the Heineken brewing company
 Freddie M. Garcia (born 1944), Filipino business executive
 Freddie Rodriguez, American politician who assumed office in 2013

Others
 Freddie Carpenter (1920–2003), Archdeacon of the Isle of Wight
 Freddy Deeb (born 1955), Lebanese-born American professional poker player
 Freddie Figgers (born 1989), computer programmer, inventor, and entrepreneur
 Alfredo Cantu Gonzalez (1946–1968), United States Marine Corps sergeant awarded the Medal of Honor, nicknamed "Freddy"
 Freddie Oversteegen (1925–2018), Dutch assassin during World War II
 Freddy Rouhani (born 1963 or 1964), Iranian-born American professional poker player
 Frederic Calland Williams (1911–1977), English engineer sometimes known as Freddie Williams
 Freddie Williams (businessman) (1942–2008), Scottish bookmaker

Fictional characters

 Freddy Auratus, a golden hamster from The Golden Hamster Saga, written by Dietlof Reiche
 Freddie Benson (iCarly), from iCarly
 Freddie Falcon, official mascot of the National Football League's Atlanta Falcons
 Freddie and Frieda Falcon, mascots of Bowling Green State University
 Freddy Fazbear, a character in the horror game Five Nights at Freddy's by Scott Cawthon
 Freddie Fear, in his own comic strip in the UK comic The Beano
 Freddy Freeman or Captain Marvel Jr., currently a DC Comics hero
 Fred Jones (Scooby-Doo), in the Scooby Doo series
 Freddy Krueger, a killer in the A Nightmare on Elm Street series and other films
 Freddie McClair, from generation 2 of Skins
 Freddy Newandyke, from the film Reservoir Dogs
 Freddy Riley, a survivor in the video game Identity V
 Freddie Roscoe, in the UK soap opera Hollyoaks
 Freddie "Boom Boom" Washington, in the television series Welcome Back, Kotter
 Freddy (weather), a cartoon weatherman in Hong Kong
 Freddy the Pig, in a series of children's books written by Walter R. Brooks
 Fat Freddy Freekowtski, one of the main Fabulous Furry Freak Brothers.

See also
 Fredi (disambiguation)
 Federico
 Fred (name)
 Freddo
 Frédéric
 Frederick (given name)
 Frederico
 Fredrik
 Fredro
 Friedrich (given name)
 Fryderyk (given name)
 Freddy (disambiguation)

References

Lists of people by nickname
Hypocorisms
English masculine given names